Major-General Sir Robert McCarrison, CIE, FRCP (15 March 1878 – 18 May 1960) was a Northern Ireland physician and nutritionist in the Indian Medical Service, who was made a Companion of the Indian Empire (CIE) in 1923, received a knighthood in July 1933, and was appointed as Honourable Physician to the King in 1935.

McCarrison was born in Portadown, in County Armagh, Northern Ireland. He qualified in Medicine at Queen's College, Belfast in 1900. He joined the Indian Medical Service and was posted as Medical Officer to Indian troops guarding the mountainous Northern Frontiers. He was promoted to Captain in January 1904, to Major in July 1912, Lieutenant-Colonel in January 1918, Colonel from 1929, and to Major-General in July 1933. He retired from the Indian Medical Service on 19 August 1935. McCarrison's research in India on the cause of goitre won widespread recognition and in 1913 he was promoted to do research. In 1928 he became Director of Nutritional Research in India, where he remained until his retirement from the Indian Medical Service in 1935, when he returned to England, settling at Oxford.

Pioneer in nutrition research
McCarrison carried out the very first experiments to demonstrate the effect of nutrition on the epidemiology of disease.

McCarrison is credited with being the first to experimentally demonstrate the effect of deficient dietaries upon animal tissues and organs. He also carried out human experiments aimed at identifying the cause of goitre, and included himself as one of the experimental subjects. Much of McCarrison's work was pioneering. His 1921 book Studies in Deficiency Disease was considered notable at the time, being published at a time when knowledge of vitamins and their role in nutrition was crystallizing.  McCarrison himself noted that prior to publication of his studies on the pathogenesis of deficiency disease "no systemic post-mortem examination of animals fed on food deficient in vitamin B had ever been made; the histopathological effects of such food on the various systems of the body were wholly unknown; above all, its effects on the gastro-intestinal tract and the organs of digestion and assimilation, and the significance of these effects for clinical medicine, were wholly unsuspected".

At age 23, McCarrison went to India, where he spent 30 years on nutritional problems. He attained the rank of major-general in the Indian Medical Service, and founded the Nutritional Research Laboratories in Coonoor. After retiring from the Indian Medical Service in 1935, he gave a series of Cantor lectures at the Royal Society of Arts, about the influence of diet on health. This comprised three lectures delivered on successive Mondays at the Society. The first lecture focused on the processes of nutrition; the second, on food essentials and their relationship to bodily structure and function; the third on disease prevention and physique improvement by attention to diet. The lectures were subsequently published in book form under the title Nutrition and Health, and at the time of the third edition in 1962, were still not seen as "dated", with the advances of the preceding 25 years largely filling the details of the principles previously recognised by McCarrison.

"McCarrison's work on goitre, cretinism, and  thyroid, begun in the western Himalayas in 1902, generated scores of scientific publications during the following thirty-five years", While McCarrison's work is often considered the start of serious studies of goitre and cretinism in South Asia, it was preceded by that of Commissioner David Scott at Rangur in north-east India around 1825, and was investigated by Mountford Bramley at Kathmandu in 1832.

In 1918, McCarrison founded the Beri-Beri Enquiry Unit in a single room laboratory at the Pasteur Institute in Conoor, India. He was invalided to Britain from 1920–1922, and in 1923 the enquiry was axed on financial grounds. It was restored two years later as the Deficiency Disease Inquiry, which McCarrison headed from 1925-1929. Around 1928-29, this developed further into the Nutrition Research Laboratories (NRL. Renamed the National Institute of Nutrition in 1969), with McCarrison as its first Director, until his retirement in 1935. In 1926, as head of the Deficiency Diseases Inquiry, McCarrison submitted written and oral evidence on malnutrition to the Royal Commission on Agriculture in India. The primary objective of McCarrison's submission was to indicate the significance of malnutrition "as a cause of physical inefficiency and ill-health among the masses in India"; the relationship between nutrition and agriculture; and "the necessity for closer co-ordination of nutritional, medical, veterinary and agricultural research" in India. McCarrison's submission had impact. "A decade later, when the Commission's chairman, Lord Linlithgow, became Viceroy of India he showed a personal interest in nutrition, pushing it to the top of the research agenda. In 1936 a Nutrition Advisory Committee was established and roughly a tenth of IRFA's annual grants went to fund nutrition research at Coonoor and Calcutta".

Retirement from India
After the Second World War, from 1945 to 1955, McCarrison served  as director of postgraduate medical education at Oxford University.

Personal life
In 1906 he married Helen Stella Johnston, to whom he was still married at the time of his death.

Legacy
 The National Institute of Nutrition in Hyderabad, India, continues to pay tribute to is origins in 1928 under McCarrison.
 McCarrison is grouped, along with Sir Albert Howard and Richard St. Barbe Baker, as one of three progenitors of the organic agriculture movement.

McCarrison Society
In 1966, a group of doctors, dentists and veterinarians, interested in the promotion of nutrition and health, founded the McCarrison Society in honour of his efforts, with a Scottish group established in 1981 due to both travel logistics and differing needs in the Scottish population.

The Society aims "to assemble scientific knowledge on nutrition and health that is free from economic and political pressures with the object of securing the physical and mental health of future generations". The Society meetings sometimes raise questions with elusive answers, with speakers presenting material based on scanty, often anectdotal data, inviting criticism that it is "a gathering of cranks". However, "one answer to that criticism is that speakers at MCarrison meetings tend to be rather well qualified. But the main point is that the society has a way of asking questions about the environment - what are we doing to it and what it is doing to us - that are of profound importance". The journal "Nutrition and Health" is the official journal of the McCarrison Society and is listed in PUBMED. The journal was started by members in 1978 with the objective of publishing peer reviewed scientific work and reviews on nutrition and health from academic research workers who were independent of the food and agricultural industries or those with a conflict of interest.

The Society's website summarises McCarrison's work thus:

His researches were extensive; they included work on the newly discovered vitamins and on the contrasting disease patterns in the Indian subcontinent. He demonstrated how many common diseases increasingly prevalent in industrial societies were caused simply by diets made defective by extensive food processing, often with the use of chemical additives. He deplored the universal consumption in Britain and America of refined white flour, instead of halite flour, and the substitution of canned, preserved and artificially sweetened products for fresh natural food.

McCarrison's work was widely published in the medical press. He was honoured for his discoveries, but completely ignored by government and the medical profession at a time when medical thought was absorbed in the study of disease rather than on prevention and the promotion of health.

Publications
The following is a selection of works published by McCarrison. To avoid duplication, this does not include works cited, which are to be found in the References section.

 
 
 
 
  download page
 
 
 . Retrieved 12 August 2010
 
  (Full text at Internet Archive).
  (Online registration to view articles is free).
 
 
 
 
 
 
 (1945 photo-lithographic reproduction by Lee Foundation for Nutritional Research. Full text at Internet Archive).
 
 
  (Pay-per-view access).
 
 
 
 
 
 
 
 . Retrieved 12 August 2010
  JUSTOR link
 
 
 
 
 
 
 
 
 
 
 }

Explanatory notes 

a.  The bulk of McCarrison's work appears to have been published in the British Medical Journal (BMJ), although he did publish in other journals, such as JAMA and The Lancet, amongst others. Some publications are also found in the Proceedings of the Royal Society of Medicine. Free access to publications BMJ and the Proceedings is to be found in the external links section. Some of McCarrison's publications listed are from those journals, but links were not located at time of listing. They should however, be available at these websites, along with other publications by or about McCarrison from those two journals which have not been located or listed.

b.  This letter is by the "nominal overseer" of McCarrison's last salaried post. It contains particularly insightful commentary on the contribution of McCarrison at a time of significant change in the existing university and medical institutions of the UK.

c.  The author of this obituary letter on McCarrison is identified only as "N.C.P.", which are also the initials of N.C. Penrose, author of a 1951 letter defending the legacy of McCarrison's earlier works.

d.  A book review of the 1953 edition is cited in this article, hence the listing. However, there have been other publications of this book both before and since. A publication from 1944 (Nutrition and National Health) is to be found via web searches comprising the same lecture and essay collection. And publications in 1961 and 1982, under Nutrition and Health, are also to be found. A new edition was produced in 2010, and may found at Lulu, a Print on Demand / Self-Publishing service.

Citations

General and cited references 
The following works discuss aspects of the life and work of Robert McCarrison.

 
  ebook 
 
 
 
 . Retrieved 11 August 2010.
  retrieved 11 August 2010

External links
 British Medical Journal online archive Access to articles is free, but requires a simple registration.
 RSM journal archives back to 1809 at PubMed Central Contains archives of the Proceedings of the Royal Society of Medicine, access to which is free
 McCarrison Society for Nutrition and Health - homepage

1878 births
1960 deaths
20th-century Irish medical doctors
20th-century Irish non-fiction writers
British Indian Army generals
British nutritionists
Companions of the Order of the Indian Empire
Diet food advocates
Dietitians
Fellows of the Royal College of Physicians
Indian Army personnel of World War I
Indian Medical Service officers
Knights Bachelor
Medical doctors from Northern Ireland
People from Portadown